In mathematical representation theory, coherence is a property of sets of characters that allows one to extend an isometry from the degree-zero subspace of a space of characters to the whole space.

Definition

Suppose that H is a subgroup of a finite group G, and S a set of irreducible characters of H. Write I(S) for the set of integral linear combinations of S, and I0(S) for the subset of degree 0 elements of I(S). Suppose that τ is an isometry from I0(S) to the degree 0 virtual characters of G. Then τ is called coherent if it can be extended to an isometry from I(S) to characters of G and I0(S) is non-zero. Although strictly speaking coherence is really a property of the isometry τ, it is common to say that the set S is coherent instead of saying that τ is coherent.

Feit's theorem

Feit proved several theorems giving conditions under which a set of characters is coherent. A typical one is as follows. Suppose that H is a subgroup of a group G with normalizer N, such that N is a Frobenius group with kernel H, and let S be the irreducible characters of N that do not have H in their kernel. Suppose that τ is a linear isometry from I0(S) into the degree 0 characters of G. Then τ is coherent unless 
either H is an elementary abelian group and N/H acts simply transitively on its non-identity elements (in which case I0(S) is zero)
or H is a non-abelian p-group for some prime p whose abelianization has order at most 4|N/H|2+1.

Examples

If G is the simple group SL2(F2n) for n>1 and H is a Sylow 2-subgroup, with τ induction, then coherence fails for the first reason: H is elementary abelian and N/H has order 2n–1 and acts simply transitively on it. 

If G is the simple Suzuki group of order  (2n–1) 22n( 22n+1)
with n odd and n>1 and H is the Sylow 2-subgroup and τ is induction, then coherence fails for the second reason. The abelianization of H has order 2n, while the group N/H has order 2n–1.

Examples

In the proof of the Frobenius theory about the existence of a kernel of a Frobenius group G where the subgroup H is the subgroup fixing a point and S is the set of all irreducible characters of H, the isometry τ on I0(S) is just induction, although its extension to I(S) is not induction.

Similarly in the theory of exceptional characters the isometry τ is again induction.

In more complicated cases the isometry τ is no longer induction. For example, in the Feit–Thompson theorem  the isometry τ is the Dade isometry.

References

Finite groups
Representation theory